USS LST-282 was a  in the United States Navy during World War II.

Construction and career 
LST-282 was laid down on 12 July 1943 at American Bridge Company, Ambridge, Pennsylvania. Launched on 3 October 1943 and commissioned on 12 November 1943.

During World War II, LST-282 was assigned to the Europe-Africa-Middle theater. She took part in the Invasion of Normandy from 6 to 25 June 1944 and the Invasion of southern France in August 1944. On 15 August 1944, she was struck by a German Henschel Hs 293 radio-controlled bomb.

LST-282 was struck from the Navy Register on 16 September 1944.

Gallery

Awards 
LST-282 have earned the following awards:

American Campaign Medal
European-Africa-Middle East Campaign Medal (2 battle stars)
World War II Victory Medal

Citations

Sources 
 
 
 
 

World War II amphibious warfare vessels of the United States
Ships built in Ambridge, Pennsylvania
1943 ships
LST-1-class tank landing ships of the United States Navy
Ships sunk by German aircraft